Sri Lanka's cricket tour of India in the 1990-91 season consisted of one Test match and a three-match ODI series.  India won the only Test as well as the ODI series 2-1

Test series

Only Test

ODI Series

1st ODI

2nd ODI

3rd ODI

References 

International cricket competitions from 1988–89 to 1991
1990 in Sri Lankan cricket
1990 in Indian cricket
1991 in Sri Lankan cricket
1991 in Indian cricket
Sri Lankan cricket tours of India